Hånger is a locality situated in Värnamo Municipality, Jönköping County, Sweden with around 301 inhabitants in 2010.

References 

Populated places in Jönköping County
Populated places in Värnamo Municipality
Finnveden